Magnano in Riviera is a comune (municipality) in the Province of Udine in the Italian region Friuli-Venezia Giulia, located about  northwest of Trieste and about  northwest of Udine.

Magnano in Riviera borders the following municipalities: Artegna, Cassacco, Montenars, Tarcento, Treppo Grande.

Demographic evolution

References

Cities and towns in Friuli-Venezia Giulia